Techiman is a city and is the capital of Techiman Municipal and Bono East Region of Ghana. Techiman is a leading market town in South Ghana. Techiman is one of the two major cities and settlements of Bono East region. Techiman is home to West Africa's largest traditional market. Techiman has a settlement population of 104,212 people in 2013. Techiman is located at a historical crossroads of trade routes and the Tano River, and serves as capital of the Techiman Municipal District.

History
According to oral tradition, the Akans which constitute the largest ethnic group in Ghana, moved from ancient Bono State; a historical location known as Bono Manso, a suburb in Techiman Municipality. The Fantes (an Akan people), according to their oral tradition, migrated from Techiman to found the coastal Mankessim Kingdom that covers present Central region and Western regions in 1252. Others from the Akan people would later follow and formed their own states and city states, such as the now extinct Adanse state, the Akyem and Akwamu states, among others. After Bono Manso, capital of the Bono state, was taken by the Ashanti Empire in 1723, then the Bono-Techiman state was founded in 1740 under Ashanti sovereignty. However, all the Akans according to oral tradition settled and migrated from Bono and were part of the Bono State until when the Bono State was conquered in war by the Ashantis.

Techiman is the heart of the Bonokyempem clan, a group of Traditional Bono Ahafo Chiefs who eventually joined forces and campaigned for the formation of the Brong Ahafo Region from the Ashanti Region on April 4, 1959, in accordance with the Ashanti Region Act 18 of 1959. Nana Kwaakye Ameyaw III, former paramount chief of Bono

Traditional Area, was the driving force behind the founding of the "Bonokyempem" clan.

Climate

Demographics

The population has grown rapidly in recent decades, doubling between the 1970 and 1984 censuses, and again doubling by the next census in 2000. The estimate of 79,547 in 2007, is nine times the population that the town had in 1960.

Institution 

 Free Family

Education 
 Techiman Municipal Assembly School
 Techiman St. Paul's Roman Catholic Primary School

Vegetation and Agriculture 
The Techiman Municipality contains three major vegetation zones: the Guinea-Savanna woodland in the north-west, the semi-deciduous zone in the south, and the Transitional zone extending from the south-east and west to the north.

The principal land uses include crop production and livestock production. Aquaculture is on the verge of development and a tiny portion is undergoing replanted to join Asubima Forest Reserve.

Market 
Techiman is undeniably one of Ghana's busiest cities, and it is widely regarded as one of the country's top commercial centres. Techiman is home to West Africa's largest traditional market. It is frequented by merchants from Togo, Benin, Côte d'Ivoire, Burkina Faso, and Mali.

The Techiman Municipality is strategically located between the savanna and forest zones of Ghana, making it an ideal trading hub.

Techiman is commonly referred to as the "Food Basket of Ghana" due to the fact that its market operations take place from Tuesday through Friday every week of the year, attracting traders from around West Africa.

Due to the city's socioeconomic structure, Techiman's population is very cosmopolitan, consisting of individuals from many racial, economic, and social-political backgrounds.

Culture

Techiman has started the construction of a modern culture centre. The purpose of the centre is the preservation of the traditions of the Bono nation. Techiman celebrates the annual Apoo in April/May – a kind of Mardi Gras. Before 2009, the celebration of Apoo had been suspended for several years due to the decease of the Bonoman king. The climax of the Apoo is the durbar of the king (Omanhene) through Techiman. In August, an annual yam ceremony takes place and it marks the end of the yam production in the Brong-Ahafo Region towns of Techiman and Wenchi. Ghana government support Techiman Land with money( gift ). The gift is for the development of their Land and the protection of their culture.

Transport
Techiman is connected by road to Sunyani and its domestic airport, the Sunyani Airport. Techiman is not yet serviced by a railway station on the Ghana Railway Corporation, and it has been proposed that a line be extended to Techiman. The Tano River is a navigable river.

There are Public Transports from Techiman to major cities such as Accra ; Kumasi;  Mim, Ahafo ; Sunyani; Takoradi; Tema; Ho; Wa; Bolgatanga; Elubo; Aflao

A study of traffic in Techiman in March 2007 found a breakdown of 34% for taxis, 31% for pedestrians, 10% for buses and vans, 7% for bicycles, 6% for motorbikes, 5% for cars and 7% for "other" modes of transportation. Of bicyclists, a focus of the study, 49% travelled for work, 18% for school, 14% for recreation and 6% for touring.

Sister city
Techiman, in partnership with nearby Sunyani, currently has a sister city relationship with:

On 11 October 2012, Techiman and Sunyani municipalities signed a Memorandum of Understanding (MoU) to seal their sister-city relationship with Tuscaloosa Sister Cities International of Alabama State in the United States.

Sports 

 Techiman Eleven Wonders
 Ampem Darkoa Ladies F.C.
 Techiman City FC

References

Literature
Frank Asante, Frank Asante in Abenim-Techiman, 14 December 1990.

Populated places in the Bono East Region